Graham Roberts (10 October 1929 – 28 October 2004) was an English actor best known for his work on BBC Radio 3 and BBC Radio 4, including 31 years playing George Barford, the gamekeeper in Radio 4 soap opera The Archers.  He was born and raised in Chester, and was educated at King's School in the city. Later, he studied at Bristol and later Manchester University.

He also appeared on film and television, including the series Z Cars. He was also a continunuity announcer with Yorkshire Television until 1993, alongside announcing colleague Redvers Kyle - both announcers made a rare in-vision appearance on the regional news programme Calendar the same evening. He also worked at Grampian Television.

Roberts died on 28 October 2004.

References

External links
 Obituary in The Independent.
 BBC News item on Roberts's death.
 

1929 births
2004 deaths
English male radio actors
English male television actors
Radio and television announcers
People from Chester
Actors from Chester
Male actors from Cheshire
Yorkshire Television